Jalan Tasek (Perak State Route A172) is a major road in Perak which is one of the 13 states of Malaysia.  “Jalan” means “road” in the Malay language, and “Tasek” means “lake”.

List of junctions and towns

Footnotes

Tasek